Depth charge may refer to:

 Depth charge, an anti-submarine weapon fused to go off at a certain depth
 Depth charge (cocktail), a cocktail made by dropping a shot glass of liquor into a glass partially filled with some other beverage 
 Depth Charge (horse), a thoroughbred racehorse
 Depth Charge (film), a 1960 film directed by Jeremy Summers
 Depth Charge, a video game for the Apple II 
 Depthcharge, a 1977 arcade game produced by UPL
 Depth Charge (Transformers), a character in Transformers universe
 Depth Charge (G.I. Joe), a fictional character in the G.I. Joe universe

Music
Depth Charge (EP), an EP by Little Nobody
 Depth Charge, an alias of British DJ & multi-instrumentalist Jonathan Saul Kane
 "Depth Charge", a song by Flume from his EP Skin Companion EP 2
 "Depth Charge", a song by Devin Townsend from his album Accelerated Evolution